The Tanezumi rat (Rattus tanezumi), also known as the Asian rat or Asian house rat, is a species of rodent in the family Muridae.  It is closely related to the black rat (Rattus rattus).  It is widespread in eastern, southern and south-eastern Asia, being found in Bangladesh, Bhutan,  Cambodia, China, Cocos (Keeling) Islands, Fiji, India, Indonesia, Japan, North Korea, South Korea, Laos, Malaysia, Myanmar, Nepal, the Philippines, Taiwan, Thailand, and Vietnam.

Gallery

References

Rattus
Rat, Tanezumi
Mammals of Bangladesh
Mammals of Nepal
Mammals of Japan
Mammals described in 1844
Taxonomy articles created by Polbot